The Metro Bridge is the only bridge of the Kharkiv Metro, located between the Kyivska and Akademika Barabashova stations on the Saltivska Line. The bridge crosses above the Kharkiv River and is fully enclosed without any windows to maintain the air flow. Its construction forced the demolition of a section of the Zhuravlivka private residential sector.

References

Kharkiv Metro
Bridges in Kharkiv
Railroad bridges in Kharkiv Oblast